Spacewalk or space walk or variation, may refer to:

 Spacewalk, or Extravehicular activity, going outside in space, beyond the spaceship or space station, in a spacesuit
 Spacewalk (2017 film), a 2017 docudrama film about the 1965 Alexei Leonov first spacewalk for mankind
 Spacewalk (software), an open-source systems management software originating from Red Hat
 Somerset Space Walk, a model solar system sculpture in Somerset, England, UK
 US Space Walk of Fame, a plaza on the Indian River, in Titusville, Florida, USA

See also
 List of spacewalks
 Space (disambiguation)
 Walk (disambiguation)